Office administration (shortened as Office Ad and abbreviated as OA) is a set of day-to-day activities that are related to the maintenance of an office building, financial planning, record keeping and billing, personal development, physical distribution and logistics, within an organization. An employee that undertakes these activities is commonly called an office administrator or office manager, and plays a key role in any organization's infrastructure, regardless of the scale. Many administrative positions require the candidate to have an advanced skill set in the software applications Microsoft Word, Excel and Access.

Administration Manager  
An office administrator has the responsibility of ensuring that the administrative activities within an organization run efficiently by providing structure to other employees within an organization. These activities can range from being responsible for the management of human resources, budgets and records, to undertaking the role of supervising other employees. These responsibilities can vary depending on the employer and level of education.

Skill Set 
The importance of an office administrator to an organization is substantial due to the duties that they are entrusted with; therefore, specialized training is required in order for the employee to work efficiently and productively, these being; 
 Payroll training that involves the responsibility in ensuring that all employees receive their pay slips on time.
 Having good communication skills in order to coordinate with other employees around the organization.
 The ability to supervise support workers
 The ability to adapt to changing environments and new technologies that could be implemented e.g. new software installation.
 Showing good initiative
 The ability to work under pressure when given a task that is of vital importance to the organization.

Roles 
There are an extensive range of roles that can be associated with an office administrator. Organizations often advertise administrative assistant vacancies targeted at students that are currently studying or who have left secondary school or college. This gives the employee the opportunity to gain experience or build a career through full-time work or an internship over the course of a summer break.

Receptionists play a key role in the organization's management, as they are entrusted with arranging and greeting clients, suppliers and visitors directly via emails, phone calls or direct mail. The employee undertaking the role of a receptionist must show good organisational, communication and customer service skills in order to ensure efficiency.  The receptionist should be aware of scammers who try to obtain the inner information of an office or medical practice to abuse or exploit it. Other responsibilities that a receptionist is entrusted with are:

 Ensuring that outgoing and incoming mail is allocated to the right department within the organisation
 Organising and assisting fellow employees with meetings, conferences and direct telephone calls when required      
 Communicating with members of the public when an inquiry is made
 Managing and maintaining the filing system that has been implemented into the organisation, e.g. information systems
 Clerical duties that involve the ordering of equipment, office supplies and other inventory that is required 
Personal Assistants are commonly associated with assisting an office manager to maintain the efficiency of their day-to-day work; this is through providing secretarial support and assistance. Becoming a personal assistant requires the employee to have experience in previous administrative jobs, which entails the use of computers and information systems. Like any other role that is related to an office administrator, the job title of personal assistant requires the employee to be organized, show professionalism and have an ability to work under pressure when given a task of vital importance. The duties that a personal assistant must carry out each day are the following:    
 Inputting, filing and managing the data that is stored within the organization's office system
 Ensuring that all contact from third-party individuals is processed through them
 Arranging transportation and meetings that are of importance to the office manager
 Ensuring that documents, reports and presentations are set up prior to any meetings
 Processing emails and letters that are received in correspondence to the office manager

Office Manager

An office manager has the responsibility of ensuring that an organization's office duties are completed efficiently and effectively, while also supervising other staff members. The role of an office manager is more demanding than other administrative positions, including skills and qualifications such as strong administrative experience, competency in human resources, reporting skills, delegation, management processes and the ability to communicate with other members of the organization.

Duties 
The duties of an office manager include: 
 Organize the office's operations and procedures by undertaking several administrative tasks, for example designing and implementing new filing systems 
 Assigning tasks to employees and following up on their progress
 Recruiting, selecting and training new employees
 Developing employees through coaching and counseling
 Producing annual budgets
 Professional development, for example by attending external training sessions

References 

 
Office and administrative support occupations